The Kokoda Track Foundation (KTF) is an international aid organisation working in Papua New Guinea. The foundation was established in 2003 and supports the indigenous people of that country. The Foundation provides education, health, and community service programmes such as disaster relief, microbusiness promotion and sustainable ecotourism.

History of the Kokoda Track Foundation
The Kokoda Track Foundation is an Australian not-for-profit organisation that works with the communities living along and around the Kokoda Track in Papua New Guinea (PNG). Following its formation in 2003, the KTF funded and prepared a Strategic Plan for Tourism for the Kokoda Track. The Kokoda Track Foundation lobbied for, and on 11 June 2003, the PNG government established, the Kokoda Track Special Purpose Authority (KTA). The KTA's first action was the development of an ecotrekking strategy to enable the people along the track "to optimise the benefits from tourism and enable them to take a leading role in their own development". The Foundation initially started provided young children in PNG with school scholarships. Over the years, the Foundation increased its support to include other areas of health, education and welfare.

The Chairman of KTF is Ian Kemish and the CEO is Dr. Genevieve Nelson. Board members include Yahoo Serious and Bill James (co-founder of Flight Centre).

KTF in Papua New Guinea 
The foundation currently works in four main areas: education, health, community development and micro-business.

Education programs

Fuzzy Wuzzy Angel Scholarships
The Foundation supports elementary, primary, secondary and tertiary students with Fuzzy Wuzzy Angel Scholarships. The scholarships cover students' tuition fees, educational resources and uniform, food, and boarding (where applicable). In 2014, the Foundation provided more than 450 students with Scholarships.

Kokoda College
The Kokoda College is a planned state-of-the-art training facility based in remote Kou Kou village. It will offer courses in Elementary & Primary Teaching and Community Health Work.

Elementary and Primary Teacher Training
The Foundation has trained more than 60 elementary teachers and assisted members of the communities to train as primary teachers via the PNG Diploma of Primary Teaching. These teachers will return to their home villages to operate the schools after they have graduated from the course.

School Resource and Infrastructure Support
In 2014, KTF continued to support 43 elementary, primary and secondary schools with educational resources including textbooks and library books, stationery, teacher resources, furniture, and general maintenance for classrooms.

Archer Leadership Scholars Program
The Foundation's Archer Leadership Scholars program, funded by the Fred P. Archer Charitable Trust, annually awards scholarships to six tertiary students in PNG who have demonstrated exceptional academic abilities, promising leadership skills and a desire to go on to future leadership roles in PNG.

Health programmes
The Kokoda Track Foundation is currently supporting nine students from villages along the Kokoda Track to train as Community Health Workers at various schools of nursing throughout the country. Once qualified, these community members return to their home village and operate the local aid post. The foundation funds the salaries of Community Health Workers along the Track to ensure that aid posts and health centres remain open and health services are available to local villagers. The foundation also funds and delivers vital drugs and medical resources to aid posts and health centres in the Kokoda Track catchment area including the Kokoda Memorial Hospital.

Microbusiness
This year the foundation is continuing the Pawa Givim Meri project in eleven villages along the Kokoda Track. Via Pawa Givim Meri, small business workshops, cooking classes, and literacy training are run with women's groups in villages, assisting them to earn an income from the trekking industry. The women are establishing permanent shop fronts from which they can sell their food and products like solar lights to passing trekkers.

Community development programs

Lighting Up The Track
The Kokoda Track Foundation delivers solar lights – to date this has been a total of 4,500 lights – one for every adult along the track! Solar lighting has enormous benefits for communities and helps to alleviate poverty, improve health, and enhance educational opportunities for young children. Communities have been given a vital source of light that is changing lives.

Disaster Relief
The foundation has responded to disasters including flooding and cyclones in the volatile Oro Province. In January 2013, KTF responded to severe flooding that submerged the food gardens of thousands of villagers. KTF arranged the delivery of rice and tinned fish to hundreds of villages during the crucial periods when their food gardens were submerged and couldn't be accessed.

Sustainable Ecotourism
Immediately following the formation of the Kokoda Track Foundation, KTF funded and prepared a Strategic Plan for Tourism for the Kokoda Track and lobbied for PNG government support of the plan. The plan focuses on the environmental, economic, social and cultural aspects of tourism development. KTF now partners with key groups to ensure appropriate implementation of the plan and to ensure that local communities benefit from the growing trekking industry.

References

http://www.telstrabusinesswomensawards.com/Assets/pdf/news/2012%20Press%20Releases/Finalist%20Press%20Release/2012-TBWA-NSW-v2.pdf
http://www.abc.net.au/austory/transcripts/s261395.htm
http://www.afr.com/p/national/work_space/100women/women_of_influence_genevieve_nelson_6bIHbdwFqq10fLad8YQ0zL
http://www.pngaa.net/Books/books_june08.htm
http://kokodacollege.com/about/kokoda-track-foundation/
https://web.archive.org/web/20140527211802/https://www.internationalsos.com/en/files/Hotline_Spring_vol1_2014_VCAB.pdf
http://flexiwaysolar.com/thoughts/lighting-up-png-kokoda-track-foundation-and-flexiway-solar

External links
Kokoda Track Foundation website

Development charities based in Australia
Organisations based in Sydney
Foundations based in Australia
Non-profit organisations based in New South Wales
Foreign charities operating in Papua New Guinea